Inositol pentakisphosphate (abbreviated IP5) is a molecule derived from inositol tetrakisphosphate by adding a phosphate group with the help of Inositol-polyphosphate multikinase (IPMK). It is believed to be one of the many second messengers in the inositol phosphate family. It "is implicated in a wide array of biological and pathophysiological responses, including tumorigenesis, invasion and metastasis, therefore specific inhibitors of the kinase may prove useful in cancer therapy."

IP5 also plays a role in defense signaling in plants. It potentiates the interaction of the plant hormone JA-Ile by its receptor.

References

Organophosphates
Inositol
Phosphate esters